San Pedro Valley County Park is a San Mateo County park located in Pacifica, California, which includes the headwaters of San Pedro Creek.

Location 
San Pedro Valley Park is a public park based in Pacifica, California in San Mateo County. The park is located in the Southwest area of the city and nestled within the neighborhoods of Linda Mar, and Park Pacifica (known locally as Back of the Valley). The park itself embraces the middle and south forks of San Pedro Creek, which are Steelhead spawning grounds, as well as being park situated amongst the Santa Cruz Mountain range and the foothills of Pacifica.

Activities 
The park offers group picnic areas, family picnic sites with barbecue pits, a self-guiding nature trail, hiking trails, a visitor center, and views of a seasonal water fall. Horseback riding, dog walking, and hiking are common activities enjoyed daily by visitors. Along the Weiler Ranch Road Trail, there is a small bridge that spans the creek and a dead end cul de sac with several benches, from this area visitors can often view the Quail in their natural habitat as well as California's famous state flower, the California Poppy.

Trails
 Montara Mountain Trail, 2.1 miles, includes views of the Pacific Ocean.
 The Brooks Creek Trail, 1.0 mile, to Brooks Falls which is 175 feet tall in three tiers following rain storms during the winter and spring.
 Hazelnut Trail, 3.7 miles
 Valley View Trail, 1.4 miles
 Weiler Ranch Road Trail, 1 mile known for wildlife viewing in the mornings and evenings.
 Plaskon Nature Trail, 0.1 mile, wheelchair accessible.
 Old Trout Farm Trail, .5 mile.

References

Pacifica, California
Parks in San Mateo County, California
Regional parks in California